Parapoynx bipunctalis is a moth in the family Crambidae. It was described by George Hampson in 1906. It is found in Sudan, Uganda, the Democratic Republic of the Congo, Nigeria, Niger, Benin, Ivory Coast, the Gambia and Senegal.

The wingspan is 13–19 mm. The forewings are white with dark fuscous spots beneath the subcostal vein. There is an oblique yellow postmedian fascia and a yellow subterminal fascia. The hindwings are white with a dark fuscous discal spot. Adults have been recorded on wing in February and from June to November.

References

Acentropinae
Moths described in 1906